A death growl, or simply growl, is an extended vocal technique usually employed in extreme styles of music, particularly in death metal and other extreme subgenres of heavy metal music. Death growl vocals are sometimes criticized for their "ugliness", but their unintelligibility contributes to death metal's abrasive style and often dark and obscene subject matter.

Definition
Death metal, in particular, is associated with growled vocals; it tends to be lyrically and thematically darker and more morbid than other forms of metal, and features vocals which attempt to evoke chaos, death, and misery by being "usually very deep, guttural, and unintelligible." Natalie Purcell notes, "Although the vast majority of death metal bands use very low, beast-like, almost indiscernible growls as vocals, many also have high and screechy or operatic vocals, or simply deep and forcefully-sung vocals." Sociologist Deena Weinstein has noted of death metal: "Vocalists in this style have a distinctive sound, growling and snarling rather than singing the words, and making ample use of the voice distortion box."

Terminology and technique
Death growls are also known as death metal vocals, brutal vocals, guttural vocals, death grunts, growled vocals, low pitched vocals, low growls, unclean vocals, harsh vocals, vocal fry, glottal fry, false cord vocals, death cord vocals and disparagingly as "Cookie Monster vocals". To be done properly, death growls require traditional clean/melodic vocal techniques.

In June 2007, Radboud University Nijmegen Medical Centre in the Netherlands reported that, because of the increased popularity of growling in the region, several patients who had used improper growling techniques were being treated for edema and polyps on the vocal folds.

The low, raspy, aggressive pitch of Lemmy Kilmister from Motörhead was not unlike the death growl and may be thought of as a precursor to the current style.

See also
 Screaming (in music)
 Screaming (with other purposes)
 Strident vowel
 Harsh voice
 Creaky voice
 Ingressive sound
 Pharyngealization
 Voiced epiglottal trill

References

External links
How to Do Harsh Death Metal Vocals, WikiHow

Heavy metal performance techniques
Singing techniques
Death metal